is a 1995 Japan-exclusive video game for the Super Famicom.

In 1997, Nage Libre: Rasen no Soukoku was released for the PlayStation.

Summary
Five nymphs stray off into a different world called "Nage." They constantly fight in order to return to their homeworld.

The fighting techniques all utilize a card battle system that is similar to the anime series Yu-Gi-Oh!, and their incredible offensive and defensive skills develops from the strategies learned from the card games. Since the nymphs are in high school, the kind of extracurricular activities selected when the stage begins will affect their attacking abilities. Their battle commands include: stand by, attack, item, exchange, pocketbell, anime, and save. Each card can attack the player's attack abilities in addition to their defense, hit points, and even their costumes.

Reception
On release, Famicom Tsūshin scored the game a 23 out of 40.

References

1995 video games
Japan-exclusive video games
Strategy video games
Super Nintendo Entertainment System games
PlayStation (console) games
Varie games
Video games developed in Japan